The Journal of Holy Land and Palestine Studies (formerly Holy Land Studies) is a biannual peer-reviewed academic journal published by Edinburgh University Press. The editor-in-chief is Nur-eldeen Masalha, who co-founded the journal with Michael Prior in 2002. The journal covers a wide range of topics: "two nations" and "three faiths"; conflicting Israeli and Palestinian perspectives; social and economic conditions; religion and politics in the Middle East; Palestine in history and today; ecumenism, and interfaith relations; modernisation and postmodernism; religious revivalisms and fundamentalisms; Zionism, Neo-Zionism, Christian Zionism, counter-Zionism and Post-Zionism; theologies of liberation in Palestine and Israel; colonialism, imperialism, settler-colonialism, post-colonialism and decolonisation; "History from below" and Subaltern studies; "One-state" and "Two States" solutions in Palestine and Israel; Crusader studies, Genocide studies, and Holocaust studies.

References

External links 
 

Religion in the Middle East
Middle Eastern studies journals
Publications established in 2002
2002 establishments in Scotland
Edinburgh University Press academic journals
English-language journals
Religious studies journals